The Edge of Chaos is a 2018 non-fiction book by Zambian writer  Dambisa Moyo. The book explains economies on the edge of economic overhauls.

Content
The book discusses why, in Moyo's opinion, democracy is failing to deliver economic growth and how to fix it. She further talks about the short-term as a problem focus of governments and the public.

Acceptance
Placed on The New York Times Best Seller list in October 2018, it stayed on the list for three weeks.
It was covered in Bloomberg and The Wall Street Journal. Garry Kasparov stated that he would be lecturing on the book with Moyo in May 2018 at the New York Public Library.

References

2018 non-fiction books
Economics books
Little, Brown and Company books
Basic Books books